Surprise Surprise is an Australian hidden camera practical joke television series hosted by Jay Laga'aia. The series commenced on the Nine Network in 2000 and ended in 2001. 
The series sets up people to fall prey to elaborate practical jokes with various roles played by Livinia Nixon, Ed Phillips and Michael Clohesy.

A celebrity version known as Surprise Surprise Gotcha was produced in 2007 with Matt Tilley and Jackie O.

References

External links

Nine Network original programming
2000 Australian television series debuts
2000 Australian television series endings
Hidden camera television series